Alfred Kienzle (1 May 1913 – 4 September 1940) was a German water polo player who competed in the 1936 Summer Olympics. He was part of the German team which won the silver medal. He played one match.

He was killed in action during World War II.

See also
 List of Olympic medalists in water polo (men)

References

External links
 

1913 births
1940 deaths
German male water polo players
Water polo players at the 1936 Summer Olympics
Olympic water polo players of Germany
Olympic silver medalists for Germany
Olympic medalists in water polo
Medalists at the 1936 Summer Olympics
German military personnel killed in World War II